Callipara festiva is a species of sea snail, a marine gastropod mollusk in the family Volutidae, the volutes.

Description

Distribution
This species occurs in the Indian Ocean off Somalia.

References

 Bail, P & Poppe, G. T. 2001. A conchological iconography: a taxonomic introduction of the recent Volutidae. Hackenheim-Conchbook, 30 pp, 5 pl. (updated October 2008 for WoRMS)

External links

 Lamarck [J.B.M. de]. (1811). Suite de la détermination des espèces de Mollusques testacés. Volute (Voluta). Annales du Muséum National d'Histoire Naturelle. 17: 54-80

Endemic fauna of Somalia
Volutidae
Gastropods described in 1811